Marvels is a four-issue miniseries comic book written by Kurt Busiek, painted by Alex Ross and edited by Marcus McLaurin. It was published by Marvel Comics in 1994.

Set in the 1939 to 1974 time period, the series examines the Marvel Universe, the collective setting of most of Marvel's superhero series, from the perspective of an Everyman character, news photographer Phil Sheldon. The street-level series portrayed ordinary life in a world full of costumed superhumans, with each issue featuring events well known to readers of Marvel comics, as well as a variety of minute details and a retelling of the most famous events in the Marvel universe.

Marvels won multiple awards and established the careers of Busiek and Ross, who would both return to the "everyday life in a superhero universe" theme in the Image Comics (later Homage Comics and currently DC Comics) series, Astro City.

Warren Ellis's Ruins returned to this theme in 1995 with a twisted story of an alternate universe in which everything that can go wrong does go wrong, but an actual sequel was not developed until 2008 with the release of Marvels: Eye of the Camera, but only Busiek was involved. A single issue epilogue was released in late 2019 with both Busiek and Ross returning.

Publication history
Marvels was a four-issue miniseries (cover dated January–April 1994) by writer Kurt Busiek, with painted art by Alex Ross and editing by Marcus McLaurin. It was followed by issue #0 (August 1994) containing a 12-page story of the original 1940s Human Torch by Busiek and Ross, two text articles, and 18 pages of Ross superhero pinups. The series was later collected into a trade-paperback edition.

Plot
In 1939, Jim Hammond, the original Human Torch is created by scientist Phineas T. Horton, and the project is considered a success until the android catches on fire when air is projected into its glass chamber, only to go out when the air is gone. Horton shows his creation to the public, which is met with demands from the terrified civilians to destroy it. A dejected Horton begins to bury the android, but the chamber cracks, allowing in air and enabling the Human Torch to escape. The android describes his appearance as the beginning of a "golden age".

Meanwhile, young Phil Sheldon, an aspiring photographer, and young J. Jonah Jameson are shocked by these "Marvels". Sheldon is more confused than Jameson by the spectacle and, worried, seeks the support of his fiancé, Doris Jacquet. More unusual beings begin to appear, notably Namor the Sub-Mariner, and fights erupt between him and the Human Torch. Sheldon, feeling it would be irresponsible for him to raise children in a world where these Marvels run rampant, breaks off his engagement with Doris. It is only when Captain America is unveiled to the world that Sheldon becomes less apprehensive about the Marvels. When World War II begins, Sheldon, Doris, and many others see the Marvels in newsreels joining forces with the Allies, providing public reassurance. But after rekindling his romance with Doris, Sheldon hears that the Human Torch and Namor are fighting again, and the battle this time damages New York City landmarks. During the fight, they come near but do not directly encounter Sheldon; he is knocked out by a small chunk of masonry and permanently blinded in his left eye. Still, he has lost all fears of the Marvels and goes on to marry Doris. Sheldon becomes a war correspondent in Europe, reporting on the Allied Forces and the Marvels as they combat the Nazis.

In the mid-1960s, a married Sheldon is now the father of two girls, Beth and Jennie, and he is preparing to write a book called Marvels. New York now has two superhero teams, the Fantastic Four and the Avengers. Sheldon is excited by recent news of the return of Captain America, a hero from his youth, but the public has begun to fear mutants, especially the mutant team known as The X-Men. As he covers an anti-mutant mob that comes face to face with the X-Men, he hears X-Men leader Cyclops refuse to engage with the mob, saying "they're not worth it" and leaving. Sheldon, unsure of their meaning, finds the words staying with him. On the positive side, some Marvels are treated as celebrities, as seen by Sheldon at the gala opening of Alicia Masters' sculptures. Gossip spreads over the upcoming marriage of the Fantastic Four's Reed Richards and Susan Storm. Sheldon leaves the gala and rushes home after hearing about the anti-mutant mob near there, and he finds his daughters hiding their friend, a mutant girl with a skull-like head. Sheldon sees the importance of hiding this girl, but is worried for his family. Following the wedding, mutant-hunting robots called Sentinels are unleashed during a television debate involving Professor Xavier; they malfunction and begin rampaging throughout the city. A mob forms, attacking and destroying everything in sight, with only Sheldon helping the injured. The newly repaired Sentinels stop the mob, but Sheldon returns home to find the mutant girl gone.

As the 1960s progress, Sheldon is preoccupied with his work, to the detriment of his family. The news is filled with stories of the Avengers being declared a menace; the law going after Tony Stark; sightings of Spider-Man, who the public is unsure is a hero or a danger; and a possible Judgement Day. The Silver Surfer appears to the world and defeats the Fantastic Four, heralding the appearance of Galactus. With the city in panic, Sheldon believes the Earth will end, and he returns home to be with his family in the final moments. Suddenly, news comes that the Fantastic Four have managed to defeat Galactus, saving Earth. In the wake of the team's victory, Sheldon promises he will spend more time with his family. However, he is later disgusted by the way the public has again turned on the heroes, with one newspaper claiming the Galactus threat was a hoax. Sheldon rages at a crowd carrying on an anti-mutant conversation.

In the 1970s, Sheldon releases his book Marvels, and it is an instant bestseller. He remains dismayed at the public's reaction to the Marvels and is disgusted by Jameson (who is now publisher of the Daily Bugle) and his screeds against Spider-Man, who has been framed for the death of NYPD Captain George Stacy. Sheldon resolves to investigate the murder and clear Spider-Man's name. While talking to a witness with Luke Cage, he learns that not only do the police believe Spider-Man is innocent, but that they suspect Otto Octavius is the killer. Sheldon interviews Octavius, but he refuses to confess to the murder. Sheldon then interviews Stacy's daughter Gwen and develops a friendship with her. Gwen's admiration and trust in the Marvels gives Sheldon a sudden insight: the purpose of the Marvels is to protect innocents like Gwen. On his way to meet her at Peter Parker's apartment, Sheldon witnesses Gwen's kidnapping by the supervillain Green Goblin. He follows the Goblin to the Brooklyn Bridge and a confrontation with Spider-Man. Watching their battle through a telephoto lens, Sheldon is certain that Spider-Man will defeat the villain and rescue the innocent victim, because that's what Marvels do. Instead, Gwen is knocked off the bridge and killed, and Sheldon's faith in the Marvels is shattered. He plans to retire, but before he can hang up his camera, a final photo is taken of Phil, his wife, and a "nice, normal boy" — Danny Ketch, who, unbeknownst to Sheldon, will grow up to become the demonic hero Ghost Rider.

Epilogue
During Christmas time, Sheldon is with his daughters in Rockefeller Center when the Sentinels begin attacking. The X-Men, who were walking among the crowd, spring into action with Sheldon and his daughters left in awe at both Banshee and Storm. After the Sentinels are defeated, the cops try to monitor the situation when Nova, who admits that he is new, appears to help with any civilian casualties. Beth and Jennie ask their father if what occurred was anything like his old job, to which he answers positively adding: "It's scary. It's exciting. It's thrilling. All of it at once". Having relived the thrill and earning the gumption to write another article, he resists and takes his daughters back home for the night.

Collected editions
In 1995, Marvels was compiled into a trade paperback that featured the Human Torch short story (2003 re-release ). For the tenth anniversary in 2004 Marvel released a 400-page hardcover. In 2008 the original was reprinted as a hardcover and softcover volume (by Panini Comics) and in 2012 as issue 15 of The Official Marvel Graphic Novel Collection as number 13.

Awards

Awards won
 1994 Eisner Award for Best Finite/Limited Series
 1994 Eisner Award for Best Painter - awarded to Alex Ross
 1994 Eisner Award for Best Publication Design - awarded Comicraft

Nominations
 1994 Eisner Award for Best Cover Artist - awarded to Alex Ross
 1994 Eisner Award for Best Single Issue - for Marvels #2 "Monsters"

Sequels
Marvel later published similar limited series under the "Marvels" header, with other writers and painters, though none of these titles were as successful as the original. They were collected in the paperback Marvels Companion.

In 1995, Marvel released the darker Ruins by writer Warren Ellis and painters Cliff and Terese Nielsen, which was a two-issue parallel world series in which Sheldon explored a Marvel Universe that had gone terribly wrong.

The 1997 miniseries Code of Honor, written by Chuck Dixon  and painted by Tristan Shane and Brad Parker, had a similar approach to Marvels, following a police officer whose job is affected by the superheroes and villains. Busiek declared he and Ross debated on doing a Marvels sequel, only for Ross to bail out not wanting to draw Wolverine and the Punisher, and once the writer himself left the project, Busiek refitted the intended plot on "The Dark Age" arc of his title Astro City.

In 2008, the long-planned direct sequel, the six-part limited series Marvels: Eye of the Camera, began. It returns to Sheldon's perspective, after his retirement. While Ross did not return for this sequel, Busiek returned as writer, with Roger Stern as co-writer for issues #3–6, with artwork by Jay Anacleto.

A new series titled The Marvels by Busiek debuted in April 2021.

Other versions

Kingdom Come
Ross also did the artwork for the DC Comics mini-series Kingdom Come. Phil Sheldon makes a cameo at the superhero press conference held at the headquarters of the United Nations in Kingdom Come #2. He also makes an appearance in the last page of the epilogue in the Kingdom Come trade paperback. He is seated next to the Spectre in his civilian guise of Jim Corrigan and Norman McCay.

Spider-Man: Blue
Phil Sheldon is mentioned in Peter's first scene in the Daily Bugle in Spider-Man: Blue. J. Jonah Jameson requests Sheldon to cover the photo op of Harry Osborn in the hospital. He is reminded that "Phil is covering the Tony Stark trial".

Marvels X
In the third issue of Marvels X, the prequel to Earth X, Phil Sheldon is mentioned.

In other media

Television
Phil Sheldon makes a cameo appearance on The Super Hero Squad Show episode "This Al Dente Earth!", voiced by Charlie Adler. He takes a picture of Iron Man, Silver Surfer, and Galactus after Silver Surfer convinces Galactus not to devour the Earth.

Podcast
In fall 2019, a radio drama podcast adaptation of Marvels was released with the first season focusing on the aftermath of the Fantastic Four's battle with Galactus in New York City, New York, starring Clifford "Method Man" Smith as Ben Urich, AnnaSophia Robb as Marcia Hardesty, Ethan Peck as Reed Richards / Mister Fantastic, Seth Barrish as Phil Sheldon, Louisa Krause as Susan Storm / Invisible Woman, Jake Hart as Ben Grimm / The Thing, Ehad Berisha as Johnny Storm / Human Torch, Teo Rapp-Olsson as Peter Parker / Spider-Man, and Gabriela Ortega as Charlie Martinez. The adaptation was written by Lauren Shippen, directed by Paul Bae, with music by Evan Cunningham, and sound design by Mischa Stanton. Stanton was nominated for two 2020 Audio Verse Awards for their work on the podcast.

Video games
Phil Sheldon appears in Avengers (2020), voiced by Walt Gray. This version is depicted as a journalist rather than a photographer.

References

External links
 

Comics by Kurt Busiek
Comics set in New York City
Harvey Award winners for Best Continuing or Limited Series
Eisner Award winners for Best Limited Series
Harvey Award winners for Best Single Issue or Story
Parallel literature
Comic book podcasts